Sugaring Season is English singer-songwriter Beth Orton's fifth studio album, her first new work for six years. It was recorded in Portland, Oregon at the studio of producer Tucker Martine. It is her first release for the ANTI- record label with whom she signed in 2010. In 2014 it was awarded a silver certification from the Independent Music Companies Association, which indicated sales of at least 20,000 copies throughout Europe.

Critical reviews
Review aggregation website Metacritic assigned Sugaring Season a score of 76 based on twenty-eight reviews, denoting "generally favorable reviews". Thom Jurek of Allmusic gave the album four stars out of five and called it "sophisticated, mature, and rife with quiet passion", and said "its songs are informed by the struggles inherent in everyday life, but also account for dreams, small triumphs, and the redemptive power of love".

Track listing
All songs were composed by Beth Orton except where noted:
"Magpie" – 4:32
"Dawn Chorus" – 3:24
"Candles" – 3:45
"Something More Beautiful" (Orton, M. Ward) – 3:28
"Call Me the Breeze" (Orton, Tom Rowlands)  – 3:52
"Poison Tree" (lyrics partially by William Blake) – 4:06
"See Through Blue" (Orton, Clemence Des Rochers, Pierre Brault) – 1:54
"Last Leaves of Autumn" – 4:01
"State of Grace" – 4:15
"Mystery" – 4:08
Deluxe Edition bonus tracks
"That Summer Feeling" (Jonathan Richman) – 4:37
"I Wasn't Born to Follow" (Byrds) – 3:59
"Goin' Back" (Neil Young) – 4:02

Personnel
 Beth Orton – vocals, guitar
 Rob Burger – piano, harmonium, electric piano, accordion
 Brian Blade – drums, percussions
 Clarice Jensen – cello
 Ted Barnes – guitar, banjo
 Marc Ribot – guitar
 Carl Broemel – guitar
 Sam Amidon – guitar, organ, violin, backing vocals
 Eyvind Kang – viola
 Nadia Sirota – viola
 Ben Russell – violin
 Tucker Martine – percussions
 Sebastian Steinberg – bass
 Nate Query – bass
 Laura Veirs – backing vocals

Charts

References

2012 albums
Beth Orton albums
Anti- (record label) albums
Albums produced by Tucker Martine